Mohd Azwan bin Abd Fattah (born 8 January 1994) is a Malaysian professional footballer who plays as a midfielder for Malaysia Super League club Sabah.

References

External links

1994 births
Living people
Malaysian footballers
People from Sabah
Sabah F.C. (Malaysia) players
Association football midfielders